Grubišić or Grubisic is a Croatian surname. Notable people with the surname include:

 Brett Josef Grubisic (b. 1963), Canadian novelist 
 Ivan Grubišić (b. 1936), Croatian priest and politician
 Jelena Grubišić (b. 1987), Croatian handball player
 Katia Grubisic (b. 1978), Canadian writer
 Mato Grubisic (b. 1982), Norwegian football player
 Tea Grubišić (b. 1985), Croatian handball player
 Veselko Grubišić (b.1961), Croatian poet, Ambassador

Croatian surnames